Lois K. Alexander-Lane (born Lois Marie Kindle; July 11, 1916 – September 29, 2007) was an African American fashion designer and founded the Black Fashion Museum in 1979.

Early life and education 
Lois Marie Kindle was born in Little Rock, Arkansas on July 11, 1916. As a child, Lois and her sister Sammye would recreate fashions seen at white department stores. Due to her race she was never allowed in the stores to look around. Using the sketches she would draw,  Alexander-Lane would make clothing for her mother, siblings and dolls from fabric she would pick up at the Five & Dime store.She studied at the Hampton Institute and later the University of Chicago. She later married Julius Lane, a former paratrooper.

Alexander-Lane received her master's degree in fashion and merchandising at New York University in 1963 where she proposed a thesis on the historic role of African Americans in Manhattan retailing. Her professor responded by saying African Americans played no such role. Her resulting thesis "The Role of the Negro in Retailing in New York City from 1863 to the Present" (1963)—and later her life's work—proved otherwise. The thesis was voted best of the year by faculty.

Career 
In the 1940s, Alexander-Lane ran a fashion boutique in Washington, D.C. In 1942, she became a clerk-stenographer for the War Department. She later transferred to New York where she opened another boutique and worked her way up to a Planning and Community Development Officer at the Department of Housing and Urban Development in 1978. In the 1940s, Alexander-Lane started her career path in the federal government, and soon after ran a fashion boutique in Washington D.C. Around this time, She also worked as a freelance photographer for African-American newspapers, and became vice president of the Capital Press Club.

In 1965, she purchased a brownstone in Harlem, New York City, for $8,000 where she founded the Harlem Institute of Fashion in 1966 offering courses in dressmaking, millinery and tailoring. The courses were free with only a $10 registration fee and graduated 4,500 students by 1987. She also founded the National Association of Milliners, Dressmakers and Tailors in 1966.

After leaving the federal government, Alexander-Lane opened the Black Fashion Museum in Harlem in 1979 with a $20,000 grant from the National Endowment of the Arts. Originally established in Harlem on West 126th Street that now houses the William J. Clinton Foundation. It was the first collection to highlight black designers in the fashion industry throughout the country's history and Alexander-Lane received little funding and largely funded the museum herself. Because of the nature of who black designers worked for, wealthy white women, Alexander-Lane had trouble acquiring garments from those individuals and the majority of the collection consisted of accessories and memorabilia.

The museum relocated to Washington, D.C. in 1994 to a historic row house at 2007 Vermont Ave. NW. The collection comprises about two thousand garments, designed, fabricated or worn by African-Americans to tell the story of women and men of the African diaspora. The collection includes garments created by enslaved women; a dress sewn by Rosa Parks shortly before her famous arrest in Montgomery, Alabama; the original costumes designed by Geoffrey Holder for the 1975 Broadway musical, The Wiz; and gowns by Ann Lowe, a pioneering African-American designer. It was the first collection to highlight black designers in the fashion industry throughout the country's history.

Alexander-Lane has designed an extended line of garments, mostly for wealthy Sponsors; extending from the Rockefellers, Roosevelts, and Duponts. She had also designed First lady Jacqueline Kennedy's wedding gown. Alexander-Lane was part of the board of the National Association of Fashion and Accessory Designers, being a former President. Alexander-Lane was part of The National Council of Negro Women, being a charter member for them.

In 1993, Alexander-Lane received the NAACP's Crusader's Award. Alexander-Lane became a show producer for Harlem week, a week or sometimes month long event which showed off Halems fashion, in 1979.  In 1992, due to her endeavors on refining New York's poverty residents' lives, Alexander-Lane was given the Josephine Shaw Lowell Award.

Death and legacy 
Alexander-Lane eventually published her own book, Blacks in the History of Fashion in 1982. Alexander-Lane died in 2007 at the age of 91. The Black Fashion Museum collection was donated to the Smithsonian National Museum of African American History and Culture in 2007 by her daughter Joyce Bailey.

References 

1916 births
2007 deaths
African-American fashion designers
American fashion designers
New York University alumni
American women fashion designers
People from Little Rock, Arkansas
University of Chicago alumni
Hampton University alumni
Museum founders